Spain competed in the 2022 World Games in Birmingham, United States from 7 to 17 July 2022. The games were originally scheduled for July 2021, but were postponed due to the rescheduling of the Tokyo 2020 Olympic Games. Athletes representing Spain won six gold medals, six silver medals and seven bronze medals. The country finished in 12th place in the medal table.

Medalists

The following competitors won medals at the Games for the Spain:

Competitors

Acrobatic gymnastics

Mixed

Air sports

Spain qualified one pilot in drone racing at the World Games, as a result of the FAI The World Games 2022 men Selection List.

Drone Racing

Parachute

Archery

Compound

Recurve/Barebow

Artistic roller skating

Spain has qualified to the games 1 male and 2 female.

Artistic roller skating

Billiards sports

Spain qualified two athlete to compete at the games.

Canoe marathon

Spain competed in canoe marathon.

Men

Women

Canoe polo

Spain has qualified at the 2022 World Games:

Men's Team Event - 1 quote place

Men's tournament

Team roster

Alejandro Casal
Alejandro Gordo
Alejandro Valls
Ángel Gordo
Javier Arego
Iván Hoyo
Samuel Pardavila
Sergio Corbella

Dance sports

Breaking

Latin

Karate

Spain competed in karate.

Men

Women

Lifesaving

Men

Women

Muay Thai

Spain entered two athletes into the muaythai competition at the World Games.

Parkour
Spain qualified at the 2022 World Games in:

Men's individual event - 1 quota

Rhythmic Gymnastics
Spain qualified at the 2022 World Games in:

Women's individual event - 1 quota

Speed Skating 

Road

Track

Squash 

Squash

Trampoline Gymnastics

Spain qualified at the 2022 World Games in:

Women's individual event - 1 quota
Men's individual event - 1 quota

Water skiing

Spain competed in water skiing.

Jump

Wakeboard

References 

Nations at the 2022 World Games
World Games
2022